Minnow Branch may refer to:

Minnow Branch (Bear Creek), a stream in Missouri
Minnow Branch (Big Buffalo Creek), a stream in Missouri